Risti ja Ruoska is the sixth EP from the black metal band Horna. It was released on Ledo Takas Records in 2002 and was limited to 666 copies.

Track listing
Rynnäkköön! - 5:40
Risti Ja Ruoska - 4:30

Personnel

Additional personnel
 Christophe Szpajdel - logo

External links
Metal Archives
Official Horna Site

Horna EPs
2002 EPs